Kiai (also Romanized as Kīā’ī, Kiya’ī, and Keyā’ī; also known as Kīāy and Kiki) is a village in Gabrik Rural District, in the Central District of Jask County, Hormozgan Province, Iran. At the 2006 census, its population was 59, in 14 families.

References 

Populated places in Jask County